She-Devil is a 1989 American black comedy film directed by Susan Seidelman and written by Barry Strugatz and Mark R. Burns. It stars Meryl Streep, Roseanne Barr (in her film debut) and Ed Begley Jr. A loose adaptation of the 1983 novel The Life and Loves of a She-Devil by British writer Fay Weldon, She-Devil tells the story of Ruth Patchett, a dumpy, overweight housewife, who exacts devilish revenge after her philandering husband leaves her and their children for glamorous, best-selling romance novelist Mary Fisher.

The second adaption of Weldon's novel, after the BBC television miniseries The Life and Loves of a She-Devil was broadcast in 1986, the film was shot amid the first season break of Barr's ABC sitcom Roseanne, in New York City throughout spring and summer 1989. For a while, Streep, who was one of the first actresses to read the script, considered taking the part of Ruth herself but later opted to play Fisher instead, as she felt she had dealt with a similar subject in her previous film A Cry in the Dark (1988).

Produced by Orion Pictures, She-Devil was released on December 8, 1989, and grossed $15.5 million at the box office. Critics praised Barr's and Streep's performances but criticized the film for its tone. Streep earned a Golden Globe Award nomination for Best Actress - Motion Picture Musical or Comedy the following year.

Plot
Frumpy, overweight wife and mother Ruth Patchett desperately attempts to please her accountant husband Bob, who is trying to boost his business. After Bob meets narcissistic romance novelist Mary Fisher at a party, they begin an affair. Ruth, aware of the affair, confronts Bob while his parents are visiting, and Bob leaves her. Angry, Ruth vows revenge on him and Mary.

Ruth lists Bob's assets, representing his home, his family, his career and his freedom, planning to cross off each one after destroying it. With Bob away at Mary's and the kids at school, she procures Mary's financial records and overloads the electricity of the house, destroying the house in a massive explosion. She leaves the kids with Mary and Bob and tells him that she will not be returning.

Bob's second asset, his family, slowly deteriorates, as Mary's selfish refusal to learn how to be a mother causes tension in her relationship with Bob and begins to interfere with her ability to write her newest romance novel. Mary's new novel is loosely based on her romance with Bob, but her publisher considers it strange and off-putting as there is a chapter about laundry. Ruth takes a job at a nursing home under the pseudonym Vesta Rose, where she befriends Francine, Mary's foul-mouthed, estranged mother, and arranges for her to return to Mary's life at an inopportune moment. She also meets Hooper, a nurse who has worked for the nursing home for 22 years and put aside her earnings for a considerable life savings. Though Ruth horrifies Hooper by secretly switching the senior citizens' sedatives and mundane routines for vitamin and caffeine pills and enriching activities, she gains Hooper's trust by introducing her to desserts.

After Ruth is fired from the home for dumping water on Francine's bed to frame her as a bed-wetter and prevent her return, she and Hooper form a partnership and start an employment agency for downtrodden women who have been rejected by society and need a second chance. The agency is successful, and the women Ruth has helped assist her in getting revenge on Bob. Olivia, an attractive but ditsy young blonde, applies to the agency, and she is hired as Bob's secretary where he starts sleeping with her at the office. This causes Mary to become lonely and desperate at night, which makes Bob rebuff her advances. When Olivia proclaims her love for Bob, he immediately dumps and fires her. Olivia reveals to Ruth that Bob is a fraudster who cons money out of his clients by skimming interest off their accounts, then transferring it to his offshore account.

As Mary is being interviewed for a puff piece by People, her mother reveals embarrassing secrets about her that effectively destroy her career. Olivia and Ruth hack Bob's computer to conduct a gigantic embezzlement, then report this to the IRS. Ruth also mails pictures of Bob bedding Olivia to Mary. Intent on regaining control of her life, Mary forces her mother and Bob's children to behave, then throws an elegant party with her friends. All goes well until state troopers appear with a warrant for Bob's arrest. Bob's lawyer bribes a corrupt male judge to ensure a favorable verdict, and unknowingly informs Mary that Bob has been stealing from her account as well, causing her to leave Bob and sell her mansion. A woman who gained employment as a court clerk via Ruth's agency repays Ruth by reassigning Bob's case to an unbiased female judge. Bob is convicted of embezzlement and sentenced to 18 months in prison, thus destroying his fourth and final asset: his freedom. As Bob is taken away, he realizes that his greed, selfishness, and infidelity towards Ruth have left him with nothing.

Sixteen months later, Ruth and her children visit a greatly reformed Bob, who is now on considerably more amicable terms with Ruth following their divorce and looking forward to catching up with his children after his upcoming release from prison. Ruth concludes that although people can change as Bob has, not everyone does so. Mary has revived her career by becoming a more mainstream author and is at a book signing about a new tell-all book, where she signs a book for Ruth but does not recognize her. Next in line after Ruth is a man whom Mary clearly tries to flirt with, indicating she has not completely changed her ways. The film ends with Ruth smiling as she walks down a busy street in Manhattan, accompanied by women from her firm.

Cast
 Meryl Streep as Mary Fisher
 Roseanne Barr as Ruth Patchett
 Ed Begley Jr. as Robert "Bob" Patchett
 Linda Hunt as Hooper
 Sylvia Miles as Francine Fisher
 Elisebeth Peters as Nicolette Patchett
 Bryan Larkin as Andy Patchett
 A Martinez as Garcia
 Maria Pitillo as Olivia Honey
 Mary Louise Wilson as Mrs. Trumper
 Susan Willis as Ute
 Jack Gilpin as Larry
 Robin Leach as himself
 Nitchie Barrett as Bob's secretary
 June Gable as Realtor
 Rosanna Carter as Judge Brown
 Lori Tan Chinn as Vesta Rose Woman
 Sally Jessy Raphael as herself

Music
The musical score for She-Devil was composed by Howard Shore. A soundtrack album was released on November 15, 1989, by Mercury Records. Shore's score was later released in a limited edition of 1,000 copies by Music Box Records.

Reception
The film holds a 43% approval rating on Rotten Tomatoes, based on 21 reviews; the average rating is 4.5/10.

Streep was nominated for a Golden Globe Award for Best Actress – Motion Picture Comedy or Musical.

Location
The film was shot on location at 161 Cliff Road, Port Jefferson, New York 11777. The house was demolished in 2017; the 30-bedroom estate belonged to Bulgarian operetta singer and actress Nadya Nozharova, also known as Countess Nadya de Navarro Farber, who died in 2014. The home was built in 1870, and was almost 19,000 square feet. The countess lived in the home for over 40 years.

See also
 Sathi Leelavathi (1995) — Tamil remake of this film

References

External links

 
 
 

Location

1989 films
1980s black comedy films
Adultery in films
American black comedy films
American films about revenge
Films about writers
Films directed by Susan Seidelman
Films scored by Howard Shore
Films set in New York City
Films shot in New Jersey
Films shot in New York City
Orion Pictures films
1989 comedy films
1980s English-language films
1980s American films